Christmas Magic may refer to:

Connie Talbot's Christmas Magic, a 2009 album by Connie Talbot
"Christmas Magic", a 2006 music video by Aliana Lohan
"Christmas Magic", a remake of the song "Starlight Moonlight" by Secret for the 2011 EP Shy Boy
Winter Magic (album), released as Christmas Magic in some territories, a 2009 album by Hayley Westenra
Christmas Magic, a 2014 EP by Cimorelli
David Nixon's Christmas Magic, a 1974 show by magician David Nixon

See also
 The Magic of Christmas (disambiguation)